WarnerTV Film, formerly Turner Classic Movies (TCM) and TNT Film, is a German pay television channel owned by Warner Bros. Discovery International. The channel broadcasts movies both in their original language and dubbed into German.

The channel launched on the Arena satellite platform with a full 24-hour schedule in December 2006 as Turner Classic Movies.  It has later become available from other distributors, including Premiere from September 2007. On July 4, 2009, the channel was rebranded as TNT Film and started to feature recent films more prominently. The channel also switched to the 16:9 widescreen aspect ratio.

The channel was rebranded as WarnerTV Film from September 25, 2021.

Broadcasting
In August 2013, SES Platform Services (later MX1, now part of SES Video) won an international tender by Turner Broadcasting System, to provide playout services for TNT Film, and for TNT Serie, TNT Glitz, Cartoon Network, Boomerang and CNN International  (in both SD and HD) for the German-speaking market, digitization of existing Turner content, and playout for Turner on-demand and catch-up services in  Germany, Austria, Switzerland the Benelux region, from November 2013.

M7 Group's Kabelkiosk stopped broadcasting of TNT Film on 1 March 2017.

Logos

Audience share

References

External links
 

Film
Television stations in Germany
German-language television stations
Turner Broadcasting System Germany
Television channels and stations established in 2006
Warner Bros. Discovery EMEA